Radosav Bulić (born 2 January 1977) is a Montenegrin former football midfielder.

Club career
He started playing with his hometown club FK Rudar Pljevlja before moving to FK Sartid 1913 that would consequently lead him to sign with Serbian giants Red Star Belgrade. He also played with FK Radnički Obrenovac before moving to Russia where he played with FC Rubin Kazan and FC Spartak Chelyabinsk.

After leaving Russia, he played one season with FK Voždovac in the Serbian SuperLiga, before returning to Montenegro in 2008, and has represented Rudar and FK Berane in the Montenegrin First League.  In summer 2011 he joined FK Ibar in the Montenegrin Second League.

After retiring from his active playing career, he became a players manager.  He was the manager of the Montenegrin international footballer Janko Simović when he signed in March 2012 with Ukrainian FC Dynamo Kyiv.

His original name is Radosav, although numerous non-local sources usually misspell his name as Radoslav.

Honors
Zvezdara
Second League of FR Yugoslavia: 2000–01

References

External links
 
 

1977 births
Living people
Sportspeople from Pljevlja
Association football midfielders
Serbia and Montenegro footballers
Montenegrin footballers
FK Berane players
FK Rudar Pljevlja players
FK Smederevo players
FK Zvezdara players
Red Star Belgrade footballers
FK Radnički Obrenovac players
FC Rubin Kazan players
FK Voždovac players
FK Ibar Rožaje players
Second League of Serbia and Montenegro players
First League of Serbia and Montenegro players
Russian Premier League players
Serbian SuperLiga players
Montenegrin First League players
Montenegrin Second League players
Serbia and Montenegro expatriate footballers
Expatriate footballers in Russia
Serbia and Montenegro expatriate sportspeople in Russia
FC Spartak Nizhny Novgorod players